Carbon is a chemical element with symbol C and atomic number 6.

Carbon may also refer to:

In science

Chemistry
Carbon black, a filler often used to improve the properties of rubber or plastic compounds
Carbon chauvinism, a term meant to disparage the assumption that the molecules responsible for the mechanisms of life must be based on carbon
Carbon (fiber), can refer to carbon filament thread, or to felt or woven cloth made from those carbon filaments
Carbon offset, a reduction in emissions of carbon dioxide
Isotopes of carbon
Carbon dioxide equivalent, a greenhouse gas measurement
"Carbon", shorthand for radiative forcings which effect the carbon cycle and increase global warming, such as greenhouse gases

Computers and electronics
Carbon (API), a deprecated application programming interface for Mac OS X
Need for Speed: Carbon, a computer racing game developed by Electronic Arts
ThinkPad X1 Carbon, a notebook computer released by Lenovo
Rio Carbon, a product line of digital audio players
WSO2 Carbon, an open-source middleware platform
Carbon (programming language), an experimental general-purpose programming language

People 
Lolita Carbon (born 1952), Filipino singer, member of Asin

Places

Canada

Carbon, Alberta, a village in Kneehill County

United States
Carbon, Indiana, a town in Clay County
Carbon, Iowa, a city in Adams County
Carbon, Pennsylvania
Carbon, Texas, a town in Eastland County
Carbon County (disambiguation), multiple places

Other uses
Carbon (2017 film), French film
Carbon (2018 film), Indian Malayalam language film
Carbon (2022 film), Indian Tamil language film
Carbon (journal)
Carbon (Halo team), also known as Team Carbon, a professional Halo team
Carbon 15, a family of firearms
Carbon Motors Corporation, an American automotive corporation
Corral del Carbón, a building in Granada, Andalusia, Spain
Carbon (company), a technology company that manufactures 3D printers

See also

Carbonation
Carboniferous, a geologic timescale
Karbon (disambiguation)
C (disambiguation)
Carlon